Alexandros Kranis (1897 – 1978) was a Greek long-distance runner. He competed at the 1920 and 1924 Summer Olympics.

References

External links
 

1897 births
1978 deaths
Greek male long-distance runners
Greek male marathon runners
Olympic athletes of Greece
Athletes (track and field) at the 1920 Summer Olympics
Athletes (track and field) at the 1924 Summer Olympics
Olympic cross country runners
People from Megalopoli, Greece
Sportspeople from the Peloponnese
20th-century Greek people